The Eola-Amity Hills AVA is an American Viticultural Area located in Polk County and Yamhill County, Oregon. It is entirely contained within the Willamette Valley AVA, and stretches from the city of Amity in the north to Salem in the south. The Eola-Amity Hills area benefits from steady winds off the Pacific Ocean that reach the Willamette Valley through the Van Duzer Corridor, a gap in the Oregon Coast Range, moderating the summer temperatures. The Eola Hills were named after the community of Eola, whose name was derived from Aeolus, the Greek god of the winds.

Climate and geography

Like most of the Willamette Valley, the Eola-Amity Hills experiences a maritime climate that includes mild winters but summers that are cooler and wetter than the continental climate experienced by Washington State's wine regions to the north and the Mediterranean climate experienced by many of California's wine regions to the south. The climate is influenced by the Pacific currents that escape through the Van Duzer corridor gap between the Oregon Coastal Range and the Cascade range to the east which keeps many weather currents from going much further east. Through the Van Duzer, cool Pacific air comes more than 30 miles from the west in the afternoon to cool down the region, allowing the grapes to retain higher levels of acidity.

The majority of the year's rainfall comes between October and April with the peak months of growing season being relatively dry. However, harvest time in late September and October can bring the hazard of rain, grape rot and dilution caused by the vines absorbing too much water from the wet soils and funneling that into the grape berries. Additionally, migrating birds heading south for the winter will often prey upon ripening grape clusters as a food source.

The vineyard soils of the Eola-Amity hills include volcanic soils and shallow nekia series over ancient basalt beds. Throughout the AVA are soil deposits left over from the Missoula floods.

Vineyards
First registered as an independent AVA in 2006, the Eola-Amity Hills AVAs include several notable vineyards that have been provided grapes to wineries in other Oregon AVAs for years. One of the first vineyards planted in the region was Bethel Heights Vineyard, northwest of Salem, planted by pioneer grape grower, Victor Winquist, in 1977. Among the Eola-Amity Hills vineyards that will appear on vineyard designated wines include Temperance Hill Vineyard with 100 acres located northwest of Salem, Zenith Vineyard that was first planted in 1982; Zena Crown located centrally in the Eola-Amity Hills with 83.5 acres that were first planted in 2003.

There are 95 vineyards and 26 wineries with 20 tasting rooms in the Eola-Amity Hills AVA. Pinot noir is the most widely planted variety with over 1,721 acres; there are 66.4 acres of Chardonnay; 48 acres of Pinot gris and platings of Riesling, Muscat, Syrah, Dolcetto, Tempranillo, Auxerrois, Viognier, Pinot blanc, Gewürztraminer and Carmine - each less than 10 planted acres.

References

External links
 Eola-Amity Hills AVA

American Viticultural Areas
Oregon wine
Geography of Polk County, Oregon
Geography of Yamhill County, Oregon
2006 establishments in Oregon